Man and His Soul is a 1916 American silent melodrama film produced by Quality Pictures and distributed by Metro Pictures. The film was directed by Metro's resident director John W. Noble and starred Francis X. Bushman and Beverly Bayne. Much of the film was shot in Jacksonville, Florida. The film is now considered a lost film.

Cast
Francis X. Bushman as John Conscience/John Power
Beverly Bayne as Mary Knowles
Edward Brennan as Reverend Edward Knowles
Charles Prince as Stephen Might Sr. (*as Charles H. Prince)
John Davidson as Stephen Might Jr.
Helen Dunbar as Mrs. Conscience, John's mother
Grace Valentine as Eve
Etta Mansfield as Unknown role
Fred Sittenham as Unknown role
Anita Snell as Little girl

See also
Francis X. Bushman filmography

References

External links

1916 films
American silent feature films
Lost American films
Silent American drama films
1916 drama films
Films shot in Jacksonville, Florida
American black-and-white films
Films directed by John W. Noble
Melodrama films
Metro Pictures films
1916 lost films
Lost drama films
1910s American films
1910s English-language films